Alagh is an Indian surname among Sikh and Hindu Khatris. Notable people with the surname include:

Anjori Alagh (born 1981), Indian actress and model
 Maya Alagh, Indian television actress
Sunil Alagh, Indian businessman
Yoginder K Alagh (born 1939), Indian economist
Ghazal Alagh, Indian entrepreneur 

Indian surnames